Jared R. Nunes (born August 11, 1982) is an American politician and a Democratic member of the Rhode Island House of Representatives representing District 25 since January 2011.

Education
Nunes earned his BS degree from the University of Rhode Island.

Elections
2012 Nunes was unopposed for both the September 11, 2012 Democratic Primary, winning with 460 votes and the November 6, 2012 General election with 3,340 votes.
2010 When District 25 Democratic Representative Timothy A. Williamson retired and left the seat open, Nunes ran in the September 23, 2010 Democratic Primary, winning by 14 votes with 408 votes (50.9%) and won the November 2, 2010 General election, winning by 74 votes with 1,615 votes (51.2%) against Republican nominee Giovanni Calise.

References

External links
Official page at the Rhode Island General Assembly

Jared Nunes at Ballotpedia
Jared R. Nunes at the National Institute on Money in State Politics

Place of birth missing (living people)
1982 births
Living people
Democratic Party members of the Rhode Island House of Representatives
People from Coventry, Rhode Island
University of Rhode Island alumni
21st-century American politicians